Vire may refer to:

 Vire (river), a river in north-western France
 Vire, a commune in north-western France
 Vire, Dahanu, a village in Maharashtra, India